The Airborne Climax is a series of Australian high-wing, single-place, hang gliders, designed and produced by Airborne Windsports of Redhead, New South Wales and introduced in the early 2000s.

Design and development
The Climax series was intended to be a high-performance hang glider used for competition and record flying. The development team included World Champion Rick Duncan, Shane Duncan, Paul Mollison and the sailmaker, Alan Daniel.

The Climax C2 14 model is made from aluminium tubing, with the double-surface wing covered in Dacron sailcloth. Its  wing span is cable braced. The nose angle is 133° and the aspect ratio is 7.5:1.

Variants
Climax
Initial model
Climax C2 13
Climax C2 14
Climax C4
Improved model

Specifications (Climax C2 13)

References

External links
 Climax C2 photo gallery
 Climax C4 photo gallery

Hang gliders